Melby is a small coastal hamlet on Mainland, Shetland Islands, Scotland, United Kingdom; the nearest settlement is Sandness.

Gallery

References 

Hamlets in Scotland
Villages in Mainland, Shetland